
SEL may refer to:
Signalling Equipment Ltd, a trading name used by the British toy manufacturer J & L Randall
Finnish Food Workers' Union, a trade union in Finland
Left Ecology Freedom (Sinistra Ecologia Libertà), Italian political party
Selkirkshire, historic county in Scotland, Chapman code
Single-event latchup
Social and Emotional Learning, a pedagogy focusing on the study and application of Emotional intelligence (EI)
Social Enterprise London
Swedish Elite League, the English unofficial name of the Elitserien ice hockey league
Système d'Échange Local, a French Local Exchange Trading System

Art
Sensory Ethnography Lab, a filmmaking and anthropology center at Harvard University
Serial Experiments Lain, a 1998 anime series
Shankar–Ehsaan–Loy, a trio of music composers from India

Language
Self-learning of English Language
SEL: Studies in English Literature, an academic journal
Skolta Esperanto Ligo, an Esperanto Scouting association

Technology
Schweitzer Engineering Laboratories, a worldwide power systems company
Search Engine Land, a website covering search engine related news
Security-Enhanced Linux (SELinux) is a Linux kernel security module that provides a mechanism for supporting access control security policies, including mandatory access controls (MAC).
Standard Elektrik Lorenz, a German electronics firm
Systems Engineering Laboratories, an early computer manufacturer specializing in realtime systems
System Event Log, the name for a server system logger used by a variety of servers

Transportation
Mercedes-Benz SEL, an automobile model
The former IATA Airport code for Gimpo International Airport in Seoul, Korea (Currently GMP)
Southern Evacuation Lifeline, a proposed limited-access highway in Horry County, South Carolina

See also
Sel (disambiguation)